The following is a list of the busiest airports in Canada. The airports are ranked by passenger traffic and aircraft movements. For each airport, the lists cite the city served by the airport as designated by Transport Canada, not necessarily the municipality where the airport is physically located.

Since 2010, Toronto–Pearson and Vancouver International Airport have been the two busiest airports by both passengers served and aircraft movements. Toronto-Pearson's location within the most populous metropolitan region of Canada solidifies its top spot amongst all of Canada's airports, serving more passengers and having more aircraft movements than the top two other airports combined. Given its advantageous position on the west coast of Canada, Vancouver International has long served as Canada's hub for flights bound for Asia and Oceania.

In graph

2022

Canada's busiest airports by passenger traffic

2021

Canada's busiest airports by passenger traffic

Canada's 30 busiest airports by aircraft movements

2020
Air traffic decreased greatly in this year due to the COVID-19 pandemic.

Canada's busiest airports by passenger traffic

Canada's busiest airports by aircraft movements

2019

Canada's busiest airports by passenger traffic

Canada's 20 busiest airports by aircraft movements

Canada's 20 busiest airports by domestic, transborder and international passenger traffic

Notes
A.Statistics Canada figures.
B.Airport operating authority figures.
C.Estimated from graph.
D.Numbers are "suppressed to meet the confidentiality requirements of the Statistics Act".
E.Estimated figure.

References

Busiest
Canada